The Sonoma County Grapes were an independent professional baseball team and were members of the North American League.  They played as a road team in 2012 in the Northern Division along with the Hawaii Stars, Na Koa Ikaika Maui and San Rafael Pacifics.  They replaced the Orange County Flyers when that team's owners withdrew from the league.

They were owned by Centerfield Partners, who also owned the San Rafael Pacifics.  When the league disbanded after the 2012 season, there was some talk of them joining the new Pacific Association of Professional Baseball Clubs but since they could not find a permanent home the team was disbanded. They were replaced two years later by the Sonoma Stompers.

References

External links
 San Rafael Pacifics official website (Parent company of the Grapes)
 North American League website 

North American League teams
Professional baseball teams in California
Sports in Sonoma County, California
Defunct baseball teams in California
2012 establishments in California
2012 disestablishments in California
Baseball teams established in 2012
Baseball teams disestablished in 2012
Defunct independent baseball league teams